The Siege of Multan took place on 20 February 1810 as part of the Afghan-Sikh Wars, which resulted with the capture of the city of Multan (in modern-day Pakistan) by the Sikh Empire from the Durrani Empire.

Background

Multan was captured by Ahmad Shah Abdali and appointed a member of his own Sadozai clan, Shuja Khan, as the governor of the city in 1752. The fort laid inside the city. The Bhangi Sikhs captured the city in 1771 and ruled it till 1779 while Shuja Khan made Shujabad his residence which was 50 km from Multan. In 1780, son of Ahmad Shah Durrani, Timur Shah Durrani, re-captured the city from the Bhangi Sikhs and appointed Shuja Khan's son, Muzaffar Khan Sadozai as the governor of Multan.

Maharaja Ranjit Singh had previously invaded Multan three times successfully. He first led the invasion in 1802 which ended with offer of submission by Nawab Muzaffar Khan, along with some presents and a promise to pay tribute. Ranjit Singh led the second invasion in 1805 which resulted with Nawab Muzaffar Khan again offering him rich presents and a tribute of 70,000 rupees. Third invasion in 1807 happened when Ahmad Khan Sial who fled to Jhang during Ranjit Singh's invasion of Multan in 1805, persuaded Nawab Muzaffar Khan to organize a tough resistance against Ranjit Singh, noting that Ranjit Singh was busy with Holkar-Lake incident. Ranjit Singh advanced and besieged Multan but the siege was raised after Nawab yielded, paying some tribute and gifting 5 horses.

Shah Shuja lost his throne in 1809 and fled towards Punjab where Ranjit Singh became aware of Shah Shuja's plan to capture Multan. To obstruct Shah Shuja's plan, Ranjit Singh rushed to Multan and reached the outside walls of the city on 20 February 1810.

Battle
On 20 February 1810, after reaching Multan, Ranjit Singh ordered Muzaffar Khan to pay tribute but the latter refused leading Ranjit Singh to capture the city on 25 February 1810 and siege the fort. The Nawab was prepared with supplies and resources inside the fort whereas outside the fort, after making military observation of the region, selecting locations for placing mines, Ranjit Singh arranged his own supplies from Lahore and Amritsar and assigned a location to each commander. Nihal Singh Atariwala began the onslaught but it was pushed back and while planting a mine under the stronghold of the wall of the fort, Atar Singh Dhari found a counter mine which blew off, killing him and seriously injuring Nihal Singh Atariwala. Young Hari Singh Nalwa also got badly burnt while climbing the fort wall when a fire-pot was thrown upon him. Muzaffar Khan unsuccessfully sought for support from the British but after 2 months of siege, Nawab Muzaffar Khan surrendered.

Aftermath
After the Sikh victory, Nawab Muzaffar Khan Sadozai paid tribute of 180,000 rupees and 20 horses to Ranjit Singh and the latter returned to his capital Lahore. More invasions of Multan occurred the following years by the Sikh Empire. In 1812, the invasion by Sikhs ended peacefully with successful negotiation of annual tribute. In 1815, the invasion by Sikhs led due to the annual tribute falling behind, resulting with a siege where the Sikhs scaled the walls of the fort, leading to Muzaffar Khan's submission, paying 200,000 rupees. In 1816, Nawab realized tribute after brief resistance and continued to realize tribute the following year, but in August 1817, news of Nawab extorting money from the people of Multan resulting in their hardship, reached Lahore. Tired of demands of tributes, Nawab Muzaffar Khan decided to militarily resist by putting the fort in a state of defense after repairing the fort and mounting guns and gathering resources, and this led to Ranjit Singh's final conquest of Multan in 1818, resulting in the capture and fall of the city, bringing the territory under the complete domain of Sikh Empire with the appointment of Sukh Dayal Khatri as the governor of Multan and later followed with Sham Singh Peshauriya.

References 

Battles involving the Sikhs
Durrani Empire
Battles involving Afghanistan